CBV Vietnam bond Indexes (Copyright No 94/2008/QTG) is a listing of bonds or fixed income instruments and a statistic reflecting the composite value of its components. It is used as a benchmark to evaluate the market value of all Vietnamese bonds.

Overview
CBV Vietnam bond Indexes, renamed as Vietnam Bond Indexes since 2009, is the first and the currently the only index family of the Vietnam listed bond market. The indexes family contains one composite index, CBV Vietnam Bond Composite Index, and its 15 sub-indices, which includes four bond indices to track bonds in the emerging Vietnamese bond market.
CBV Government Bond Index
CBV Corporate Bond Index
CBV Convertible Bond Index
CBV Interbank bond Index

CBV Government Bond Index
CBV Government Bond Index is an equally weighted basket of government bonds in the Vietnamese bond market. It includes Treasury bonds, Municipal bonds, Agency bonds, and Supranational bonds.

CBV Corporate Bond Index
CBV Corporate Bond Index is an equally weighted basket of corporate bonds in the Vietnamese bond market. The objective of the Index is to capture the return of readily tradable, high-grade Vietnamese corporate bonds. The CBV Vietnam Corporate Bond Index includes the Utilities Bond index, the Financials bond index, and the Industrials bond index.

CBV Covertible Bond Index
CBV Vietnam Covertible Bond Index

CBV Interbank Bond Index
CBV Vietnam Interbank bond Index is an index created in order to adapt to the rapid development of the interbank bond market and to support OTC government bond transactions introduced by state-owned commercial banks. The Interbank Bond Index reflects capital gains, accrued interest, and reinvested earnings. It also provides the supervisory authorities with a picture of the bond market situation.

See also
CBV Vietnam finance indices
Vietnam Bond Indexes
Vietnam Investor Confidence Index
VND Index
Vietnam Consumer Confidence Index
Woori CBV Securities Corporation

External links 
 About Woori CBV

 Overview of Vietnam Securities Index from Woori CBV
 Detailed introduction about Vietnam Securities Index from Woori CBV

Bond market indices
Finance in Vietnam